Bronice may refer to the following places in Poland:
Bronice, Lublin Voivodeship (north-west Poland)
Bronice, Lubusz Voivodeship (western Poland)